The Diocese of Goiás is Latin Church ecclesiastical territory or diocese of the Catholic Church located in the city of Goiás. It is a suffragan in the ecclesiastical province of the metropolitan Archdiocese of Goiânia in Brazil.

History
 December 6, 1745: Established as Territorial Prelature of Goiás from the Diocese of São Sebastião do Rio de Janeiro
 July 15, 1826: Promoted as Diocese of Goiás
 November 18, 1932: Promoted as Metropolitan Archdiocese of Goiás
 March 26, 1956: Demoted as Diocese of Goiás

Bishops

Ordinaries, in reverse chronological order
 Bishops of Goiás (Roman rite), below
 Bishop Jeová Elias Ferreira (2020.05.27 – present)
 Bishop Eugène Lambert Adrian Rixen (1998.12.02 – 2020.05.27)
 Bishop Tomás Balduino, O.P. (1967.11.10 – 1998.12.02)
 Bishop Abel Ribeiro Camelo (1960.05.14 – 1966.11.24)
 Bishop Cândido Bento Maria Penso, O.P. (1957.01.17 – 1959.11.27)
 Metropolitan Archbishops of Goiás (Roman Rite), below
 Archbishop Emanuel (Manoel) Gomes de Oliveira, S.D.B. (see below 1932.11.18 – 1955.05.12)
 Bishops of Goiás (Roman Rite), below
 Bishop Emanuel (Manoel) Gomes de Oliveira, S.D.B. (1922.10.27 – 1932.11.18 see above)
 Bishop Prudencio Gomes da Silva (1907.11.17 – 1921.09.19)
 Bishop Eduardo Duarte e Silva (1891.01.23 - 1907.11.06), appointed Bishop of Uberaba; future Archbishop
 Bishop Joaquim Arcoverde de Albuquerque Cavalcanti (1891.06.26 – 1891.10.27); future Archbishop and Cardinal
 Bishop Cláudio José Gonçalves Ponce de Leão, C.M. (1881.05.13 – 1890.06.26), appointed Bishop of São Pedro do Rio Grande do Sul; future Archbishop
 Bishop Antônio Maria Corrêa de Sá e Benevides (1876.11.18 – 1877.06.25), appointed Bishop of Mariana
 Bishop Joaquim Gonçalves de Azevedo (later Archbishop) (1865.09.25 – 1876.12.19), appointed Archbishop of São Salvador da Bahia
 Bishop Domingos Quirino de Souza (1860.05.04 – 1863.09.12)
 Bishop Francisco Ferreira de Azevedo (1844.07.29 – 1854.08.12)
 Bishop Francisco Ferreira de Azevedo (1819.05.29 – 1844.07.29)
 Prelates of Goiás (Roman Rite), below
 Bishop Antônio Rodrigues de Aguiar (1810.06.24 – 1818.10.03)
 Bishop Vicente Alexandre de Tovar (1803.06.20 – 1808.10.08)
 Bishop José Nicolau de Azevedo Coutinho Gentil (1788.03.07 – 1793?)
 Bishop Vicente do Espirito Santo, O.A.D. (1782.12.17 – 1788.11.29)

Auxiliary bishop
Abel Ribeiro Camelo (1947-1957), appointed Bishop of Jataí, Goias (later returned here as Archbishop)

References

Roman Catholic dioceses in Brazil
Religious organizations established in 1745
Goiás, Roman Catholic Diocese of
Dioceses established in the 18th century
1745 establishments in Brazil